Aleksa Jovanović (born 27 May 1999) is a Serbian footballer who plays as a midfielder for Grafičar.

Club career

Radnički Niš
Born 1999, Jovanović passed the youth categories of OFK Bor, and after 9 years he moved to Radnički Niš. He joined the first team of Radnički Niš for the spring half of 2015–16 season, and made his SuperLiga debut in a match against Partizan on 6 March 2016 at Čair Stadium.

International career
Jovanović received call-ups from Slavoljub Muslin to the Serbian national team for 2018 FIFA World Cup qualification matches but did not make an appearance.

Career statistics

References

External links
 Aleksa Jovanović stats at utakmica.rs 
 
 
 
 

1999 births
Living people
People from Bor, Serbia
Association football midfielders
Serbian footballers
Serbia youth international footballers
FK Radnički Niš players
RFK Grafičar Beograd players
Serbian SuperLiga players